Telcel, known as Radio Móvil Dipsa S.A.U., is a Mexican wireless telecommunications company, owned by América Móvil. Founded in 1984 and based in Mexico City, Telcel is the leading provider of wireless communications services in Mexico. As of December 31, 2006, Telcel's cellular network covered more than 63% of the geographical area of Mexico, including all major cities, and 90% of Mexico's population. Telcel holds concessions to operate a wireless network in all nine geographic regions in Mexico using both the 850 megahertz and 1900 megahertz radio spectrum. According to Cofetel (Comision Federal de Telecomunicaciones—Mexico's Federal Telecommunications Commission), as of July 2008, Telcel's subscribers represented an estimated 77.2% share of the Mexican wireless market. Telcel is the largest wireless carrier in Mexico, with 77.2 million subscribers as of March 2020.

Voice services
Telcel provides services in AMPS, GSM, and TDMA, as well as the newer technologies of UMTS and WCDMA. Because of the wide base of older technologies like TDMA and AMPS they are still in use.

Telcel offers voice services under a variety of rate plans to meet the needs of different market segments. The rate plans are either postpaid, where the customer is billed monthly for the previous month, or prepaid, where the customer pays in advance for a specified volume of use over a specified period. Telcel believes the prepaid market represents a large and growing under-penetrated market in Mexico.

Telcel also offers several prepaid plans, none of which includes activation or monthly charges. Prepaid customers purchase a prepaid card for a specific amount of airtime and also receive additional services such as voicemail and caller ID. As part of its prepaid service offering, Telcel provides new customers with an Amigo Kit, which includes airtime, a handset, a charger and other accessories.

Customers with prepaid plans can recharge credit from anywhere in the world, just by using the official Telcet site, or any other multilanguage recharge companies. Telcel is now one of the most used phone companies from Latin America, its economy increased by 2.9% on the first semester of 2019 (+7.7% compared to Mexican GNP). However, competitors complain about monopolistic actions, given the current situation of recession for all of them but Telcel.

Prepaid customers are often unwilling to make a fixed financial commitment or do not have the credit profile to purchase postpaid plans. Prepaid plans serve the needs of distinct consumer segments such as the youth market, families, customers with variable income who otherwise would not be able to obtain service due to their credit profile, and customers who prefer to pay in cash. Prepaid customers also include parents who wish to control costs for their children.

In November 2006, an American embassy cable released via WikiLeaks listed Telcel among "Mexico's monopolists", with a market share of 80% of cellular service.  Telmex was listed with a market share of 95% share of landlines.

Push-to-Talk services

In 2004, Telcel began to offer push-to-talk services over go its GSM network, though the main push-to-talk provider in Mexico at that time, as well as in other countries, was NII Holdings (Nextel).

Data services
Two-way SMS was introduced by the company in January 2002, and MMS, using GSM technology (for postpaid and prepaid customers), commenced in March 2003. Since December 2004, postpaid and prepaid customers may send and receive short messages to and from users from 35 other countries.

In April 2002, Telcel became the first Mexican operator to offer premium information services through the utilization of its SMS capabilities; installation of the upgraded service included the development of relationships with the National Basketball Association (NBA) and the National Football League (NFL) of the United States.

Telcel supplies data services in GPRS, EDGE, 3G HSPA, 3.5G HSPA+,  4G LTE and 5G.

Ideas Telcel

Through the Ideas Telcel portal, Telcel offers its customers mobile entertainment services and, in May 2006, TV content services were included, whereby certain customers may access news, cartoons, documentaries, and sports channels on their handsets.

Internet
Wireless application protocol, or "WAP", is a global standard designed to make Internet services available to mobile telephone users. Telcel offers WAP including e-mail, data and information services and electronic commerce transactions. Telcel launched its WAP gateway in September 2000, enabling its prepaid and postpaid users in those regions to access e-mail, banking, and a variety of reservation and other types of electronic commerce services.

Telcel offers 2G, 3G, 3.5G, 4G LTE and 5G data services.

Oficina Móvil Telcel
Oficina Móvil allows Telcel customers to access email and personal information management tools on their handsets. Through alliances with companies such as Research in Motion, Palm, and Microsoft, customer products like the BlackBerry, the Treo, and Windows Mobile handsets have been offered to complement this service. Telcel also offers data coverage in Mexico, as well as other countries, where they have roaming agreements in locations that use GPRS, EDGE, and UMTS/HSDPA cellular technology.

Roaming
Telcel offers international roaming services to subscribers as well as pre-paid users. Telcel has entered into approximately 385 such agreements covering GSM and TDMA D-AMPS networks around the world. Telcel offers international roaming services including special rates to subscribers roaming in the U.S. border, the U.S., Canada and other markets.

Marketing

Telcel has consistently engaged in marketing and promotion efforts and customer service. Telcel sponsors professional sporting events, including the Abierto Mexicano TELCEL tennis event, golf tournaments, soccer, and other events in Mexico. They also sponsor a Formula One driver, Sergio Perez, along with sister companies Claro and Telmex.

Sales and distribution
Telcel markets its wireless services primarily through exclusive distributors located throughout Mexico. As of March 31, 2007, Telcel had relationships with a network of approximately 1,171 exclusive distributors, who sell Telcel's services and products through approximately 48,320 points of sale and receive commissions.

Telcel also distributes prepaid cards and handsets, the latter as part of the Telcel Amigo Kit consisting of handsets and free airtime, through distributors that include Telmex, Sears, Sanborns and its network of retail outlets. It is estimated that, as of March 31, 2007, prepaid cards are available through approximately 150,000 points of sale in Mexico.

Customer service
Approximately 55% of Telcel's employees are dedicated to customer service.

Network

3G Technology
Telcel officially launched its 3G (850MHz Band) services on February 25, 2008 initially in the cities of: Guadalajara, Hermosillo, Mérida, León, Morelia, Monterrey, Tijuana, Puebla, Santiago de Querétaro and México D.F. This was the second 3G Wireless Network, in Mexico after Iusacell's 3G Nationwide CDMA2000 network. Telcel's 3G Network expanded to other cities, to finally become a national 3G network which reaches more than 350 cities. Telcel's 3G network is based on UMTS / HSDPA / HSPA+ technology (850Mhz/Band V).

Telcel launched its HSPA+ network in Mexico City and other major Mexican cities, by the end of 2011. By May 2012, Telcel's HSPA+ network already covered most of the cities and roads in Mexico, offering its customers speeds of up to 7.2Mbit/s.

Unlike many companies, who advertise their HSPA+ network as a "4G network," Telcel advertises its HSPA+ Network as a "3.5G network,". As it counts with a 4G LTE Network, which is the one they advertise as "4G"

4G Technology
Telcel is the second company in Latin America to promote a 4G service (under LTE Band 4/1700 MHz), but the other player in the market, Iusacell, uses simply HSPA+ instead of LTE. Telcel currently offers 4G LTE service in 9 Cities in Mexico. And by the first trimester of 2013, it is going to expand its 4G LTE service, to cover a total of 26 cities in the country. It is expected that by the end of 2013, Telcel's 4G LTE Network will become a nationwide 4G LTE Network. covering more than 80% of the population. With the addition of 4G LTE Telcel now offers a wide variety of technologies including: TDMA, GSM, GPRS, EDGE, UMTS, HSDPA, HSPA+ & LTE. These technologies are branded as: 2G (GPRS, EDGE), 3G (UMTS, HSDPA), 3.5G (HSPA+), 4G (LTE) & 4.5G (LTE-A).

Radio frequency spectrum chart

Criticism
Telcel's commercial and monopolistic practices have earned a great deal of criticism among the industry and the company has received a large number of customer service complaints on consumer websites in Mexico.

Humanitarian causes and charities 
In 2012, Telcel is listed as a partner of the (RED) campaign, together with other brands such as Nike Inc., Girl, American Express, and Converse. The campaign's mission is to prevent the transmission of the HIV virus from mother to child by 2015 (the campaign's byline is "Fighting For An AIDS Free Generation".

References

External links
 
 Telcel top up in English
 Territorio Azul Telcel Reg 1 site in Spanish
 América Móvil
 Ideas Telcel
 Atención a Clientes en Línea
 Círculo Azul Telcel
 Eventos Telcel
 Mexican Consumer Protection Bureau (PROFECO)

América Móvil
Mobile phone companies of Mexico
Mexican companies established in 1984